Brana or Braña may refer to:

People
 Frank Braña (1934–2012), Spanish film actor
 Rodrigo Braña (born 1979), Argentine footballer
 Brana Dane (born 1996), American model and activist

Fictional
 Isabella Braña, fictional character from The Young and the Restless

Other
 Brana (mountain), a mountain in the Kamnik Alps
 Brana (moth), a genus of moths of the family Noctuidae
 Brana River, a river in Romania
 La Braña, a parish in Spain
 Braña, is the name that in the Cantabrian Mountains range receives the mountain area where the cattle take advantage of the late grasses in summer time.

See also
 Branná, a village and municipality in Šumperk District, Olomouc Region, Czech Republic